= Prime Minister's Fee Reimbursement Scheme =

Prime Minister's Fee Reimbursement Scheme was a scholarship to reimburse tuition fees and on and off mandatory charges for the students of Balochistan, FATA and Gilgit Baltistan.
